The second season of the Indonesian reality talent show The Voice Kids Indonesia premiered in 2017 on GTV (formerly Global TV). The show was confirmed on 17 March 2017 in an e-mail to a fan of the show.

Coaches & Host

Coach 
 Agnez Mo
 Bebi Romeo
 Muhammad Tulus

Host 
 Ananda Omesh
 Ersa Mayori

Format

Blind Auditions 
Each contestant is sing on stage where the coach (the jury) sits back to the contestant. In blind audition, the  coach  only judges the contestants of the contestant's voice quality. If  coach  likes the contestant's voice, then  coach  will hit the  I WANT YOU  button which makes the chair rotate towards the stage. Contestants elected by more than one  coach  must choose a  coach  to accompany them to the next round.

Battle Rounds  
Any contestant who has been selected by the same  coach  will be pitted by singing the same song. The  coach then will choose a contestant between other contestants who pitted to be able to continue the next round.

Sing Off 
All artists who advanced from the battle rounds will sing a song on the sing off. In each team, only four acts should be chosen to go to the semifinals.

Semifinals  
Each contestant will sing 'live' in front of the  coach  and viewers. In the semifinals the entire Indonesian audience will determine which contestants will proceed to the next round through the voting system.

Grand Final 
This round is the final round that will determine the champion of  The Voice Kids Indonesia season 2.

Teams
Color key:

Blind auditions
Color key:

Episode 1 (September 7)

Episode 2 (September 14)

Episode 3 (September 21)

Episode 4 (September 28)

Episode 5 (October 5)

Episode 6 (October 12)

Episode 7 (October 19)

Episode 8 (October 26) 

Notes

  Coach Agnez Mo requested Sharla to sing a second track, after being told that Sharla also liked singing religious songs; despite having already joined her team. Sharla selected "Assalamu Alayka" by Maher Zain, having already performed "Memory", a show tune from the 1981 musical Cats.

Battle Rounds 

The Battle Rounds starts on November 2. Season 2's advisors include: Wizzy for Team Bebi, Baim for Team Agnez Mo, and Yura Yunita for Team Tulus.

Color key:

Sing Off 

Three previously eliminated artists were chosen by the coaches to come back as coach's save for the Sing Offs. They were Vitara Harahap (by Bebi), Keisha Claudia (by Agnez Mo), and Aditya Majid (by Tulus).

Color key:

Live Shows 

Color key:

Week 1 : Semifinals (December 7) 

With the elimination of Aditya Majid and Wasisco Lianro, there is no more boy contestants remained in the competition, thus making this season the first to have all-girl final.

Week 2 : Finals (December 14) 
 Grand Final

All three coaches had an artist advance to the finale top 3 for the first time, thus making season 2 the first in The Voice Kids Indonesia history.

 Finale

Elimination Chart

Overall 
Color key
Artist's info

Result details

Team
Color key
Artist's info

Result details

Artists who appeared on previous shows or season
 Mutiara Naycilla and Vitara Harahap were on the first season of Indonesian Idol Junior in 2014, and was eliminated in Top 11 and Top 3, respectively
 Nisma Putri was on the second season of Indonesia's Got Talent in 2014, and won that season
 Florentino Louis, Merilync Tesalonika, Michelle Angeline, Rachel Dwi, Vanessa Veronica, and Yonathan Jason auditioned for the first season, but each of them failed to turn any chairs.
 Joyceline Eunike, Kimberley Fransa, Raulla Nakhlah were on the second season of Indonesian Idol Junior in 2016, and was eliminated in elimination round

Notes

References

2017 Indonesian television seasons
Kids Season 2